Pheia pyrama is a moth in the subfamily Arctiinae. It was described by Paul Dognin in 1911. It is found in French Guiana.

References

Natural History Museum Lepidoptera generic names catalog

Moths described in 1911
pyrama